Pacific Storm is a Pacific War-themed real-time strategy game developed by Lesta Studio and released by Buka Entertainment in 2005. A Western version was released by CDV Software in 2006.

Gameplay
In the game, players are able to act as a supreme commander, handling research, ship and plane design, production, troop deployment, and many other things. As a real-time strategy game, players are allowed to control individual ships and planes. Furthermore, players can also act as an ordinary sailor, who can man various anti-aircraft gun positions on a ship or man various gunner positions in a heavy/medium bomber plane, turning the game also into a first-person shooter.

Reception
This game has been criticized by many gamers due to some historical inaccuracies, mostly due to limited types of ships and aircraft available in the game.

Reviews
Worth Playing
Subsim
IGN
Gamernode
GameZone
PC Games (Germany)
Game Chronicles
4Players.de
GamingExcellence
GameSpot

Legacy
The standalone expansion Pacific Storm: Allies involves Britain as an additional playable faction. It also introduces non-playable nations such as the Netherlands, Germany, and the USSR. These nations however can be playable in the "Battle Planner" mode.

References

 
 
 
 
 

2005 video games
Naval video games
Real-time tactics video games
Video games developed in Russia
Video games set in Asia
Video games set in Oceania
Windows games
Windows-only games
World War II video games
Pacific War video games
CDV Software Entertainment games
Buka Entertainment games
Multiplayer and single-player video games
Lesta Studio games